NMBS/SNCB Class 41 DMUs are diesel multiple unit trains operated by the National Railway Company of Belgium (NMBS/SNCB). They are the standard train for Belgian internal workings which cannot be worked by EMUs. They work under the 25 kV electrification in the South of Belgium as well as on the non-electrified lines in the North.

Naming
They are often designated as "AR41" (referring to the French "Autorail") or "MW41" (for Dutch "Motorwagen") which would make them single railcars; in fact they are always operated as (multiples of) two cars joined, with a single vehicle number.

Lines operated
 Antwerpen-Centraal – Neerpelt/Hasselt (Portions separated at Mol)
 Eeklo - Gent-Sint-Pieters - De Pinte – Oudenaarde – Ronse
 Gent-Sint-Pieters – Zottegem – Geraardsbergen
 Aalst – Burst
 Charleroi Sud – Couvin

In summer, tourist trains:
 Neerpelt-Blankenberge via Herentals, Lier, Mechelen, Dendermonde, Gent, Brugge.

See also
 AR 41

SNCB multiple units